The poplar grey (Acronicta megacephala) is a moth of the family Noctuidae. It is found throughout Europe.

Technical description and variation
A. megacephala F. (3b). Forewing pale grey, suffused with dark, except in a patch beyond cell hindwing white in male, greyer in female. Larva
dark grey, with granulated yellowish dots ; segment 11 with a large yellowish-white dorsal patch ; the hairs, which rise singly, whitish : head black with pale  — In grumi Alph. the forewing is narrower, the space between inner line and median shade conspicuously whitish; this form is found in West China. — ab. ochrea Tutt has the ground colour distinctly ochreous; while in ab. rosea Tutt the forewing is rosy-tinged.

Melanic forms sometimes occur. The wingspan is 40–45 mm.

Biology
This moth flies at night from May to August  and is attracted to light and sugar.

The hairy larva is grey with black and red markings and a white patch towards the rear. It feeds on poplars and willows and sometimes on grey alder. The species overwinters as a pupa.

The flight season refers to the British Isles. This may vary in other parts of the range.

References 

Chinery, Michael Collins Guide to the Insects of Britain and Western Europe 1986 (reprinted 1991)
Skinner, Bernard Colour Identification Guide to Moths of the British Isles 1984

External links

Poplar Grey (Subacronicta megacephala) on UKmoths
Subacronicta megacephala on Fauna Europaea
Acronicta megacephala on Lepiforum.de

Acronicta
Moths described in 1775
Moths of Europe
Taxa named by Michael Denis
Taxa named by Ignaz Schiffermüller